George Burd (1788January 13, 1844) was an Anti-Jacksonian member of the U.S. House of Representatives from Pennsylvania.

George Burd was born in Pennsylvania in 1788.  He was admitted to the bar in 1810 at Carlisle, Pennsylvania, and practiced.

Burd was elected as an Anti-Jacksonian to the Twenty-second and Twenty-third Congresses.  He moved to Mercer County, Pennsylvania, in 1843, and died in Bedford, Pennsylvania, in 1844.  Interment in Bedford Cemetery.

Sources

The Political Graveyard

1788 births
1844 deaths
People from Carlisle, Pennsylvania
National Republican Party members of the United States House of Representatives from Pennsylvania